Welcome Home is a 2021 Indian Hindi-language crime drama thriller film inspired by a real-life incident in Nagpur, Maharashtra. It starred Kashmira Irani, Swarda Thigale, Boloram Das, Shashi Bhushan, and Tina Bhatia. The film was written by Ankita Narang and directed by Pushkar Mahabal. The music was composed by Meghdeep Bose, with cinematography by Saee Bhope, and editing by Pushkar Mahabal. Produced by veteran actor Paresh Rawal and his wife and actor Swaroop Rawal, Welcome Home premiered on SonyLIV in 2020.

Plot 
The plot of the film revolves around two young girls Anuja (Kashmira Irani) and Neha (Swarda Thigale) who are high school teachers and have been tasked to collect population data for the census. On their way to collect data, they come across a deserted house where a pregnant woman named Prerna (Tina Bhatia) welcomes them. The girls are taken hostages by an old man who has actually been assaulting the pregnant woman for a long time. The film shows how those girls struggle to escape from the house.

Reception

Critical response 
The film received mostly positive reviews from critics, with praise for the performances and writing. Nandini Ramnath of Scroll.in wrote "In the SonyLIV film Welcome Home, Boloram Das is far more effective and terrifying as a man who promises to perform horrible deeds and goes right ahead. Welcome Home has other strong performances too, especially by its female leads, who movingly bring out the film’s themes of imprisonment and liberation."

Avinash Ramachandran of The Indian Express said "Welcome Home might seem like a gritty chamber drama, but it is also an affecting commentary on patriarchy."

Devasheesh Pandey from News 18 gave the film 2.5 stars out of 5 and wrote "Welcome Home is not just another movie but carries gracefully a narrative that seeks transformation and liberation from victimhood, which as Anuja points out, does not rest upon gender, but can happen with anyone."

Pallabi Dey Purkayastha of The Times of India gave 3.5 stars out of 5 and wrote "Welcome Home’ gives hope: hope that every time a leach elbows a naïve-looking girl, she will fight back. Hope that every time a wife, mother or daughter is assaulted or murdered, the women would fight back and seek justice."

A reviewer for Spotboye praising the writing and performance of the cast, said "The story, written by Ankita Narang is gripping and it is a sincere effort to throw light on the hideous crimes of child abuse and sexual assault in our society. The editing is a bit jumpy towards the end and there are a few loose ends too but if we see the overall picture, that can be ignored, as the film keeps you on the edge and you want to know what's gonna happen next."

References

External links